The Pacific leaping blenny (Alticus arnoldorum), also known as the leaping rockskipper, is a species of combtooth blenny (family Blenniidae) in the genus Alticus. The blennies are oviparous, and form distinct pairs when mating. Males can reach a maximum total length of 8 centimetres (3.15 inches). These fish feed primarily on benthic algae, which they consume by scraping off rocky surfaces.

Description 

Male Pacific leaping blennies have prominent head crests and orange-red dorsal fins.

Distribution and habitat
The Pacific leaping blenny is a tropical blenny found in reefs in Samoa and the Marianas, Society, and Cook Islands, in the western and southern Pacific Ocean. The blennies are noted for leaping from hole to hole in the limestone rocks they inhabit, when disturbed; each of the common names for the species is derived from this. They are able to dwell on land for several hours at a time, and have been reported performing many activities, including foraging and mating while out of the water. However, they are only able to survive on land during midtide; if they remain out of water when the tide lowers enough that they cannot be kept moist, they dry out and suffocate. In a study performed by Tonia Hsieh of Temple University, in Philadelphia, Pennsylvania, it was discovered that members of A. arnoldorum are able to thrive on land due to their ability to twist their tails axially at 90 degrees, to propel their bodies. Hsieh noted that the twisting of the tail was a behaviourism unique to A. arnoldorum and species in the genus Andamia; the two genera were subsequently considered terrestrial.

Name
The identity of the person commemorated in the specific name of this blenny is unclear. The author, Curtiss, is known to have read The Sea-Beach at Ebb-Tide: A Guide to the Study of the Seaweeds and the Lower Animal Life Found Between Tidemarks by Augusta Foote Arnold (1844-1903) and gave several taxa a similar epithet.

References

External links
 
 
 A Highly Social, Land-Dwelling Fish Defends Territories in a Constantly Fluctuating Environment by Terry J. Ord in E&ERC

Alticus
Fish described in 1938
Amphibious fish
Fish of the Pacific Ocean
Articles containing video clips